Maiwand is a village in Afghanistan.

Maiwand or Maywand may also refer to: 

 Maywand District, in Kandahar Province, Afghanistan
 Maiwand, Pakistan, a town
 Maiwand Kabul F.C., an Afghan sports club
 Maiwand (mountain), in Bavaria, Germany
 Maiwand TV, a television network channel in Kabul, Afghanistan

See also

 Battle of Maiwand in 1880